Raúl Marcelo Burzac (born February 14, 1988) is an Argentine football midfielder who plays for CA Fénix. He is of ethnic Serb descent (his name in Serbian is rendered Марсело Раул Бурсаћ).

Career

Burzac played for a number of local teams in Tucumán before being signed by River Plate. He played in the youth divisions of the club and made one senior appearance. While at River, Burzac was referred to in the Argentine press as the new Juan Román Riquelme. He was part of the squad that won the 2008 Clausura tournament, but did not play in any of the games.

In 2010, the Argentine midfielder joined Bolivian side La Paz F.C.

References

External links
 
 

1988 births
Living people
Sportspeople from San Miguel de Tucumán
Argentine footballers
Association football midfielders
Argentine Primera División players
Club Atlético River Plate footballers
La Paz F.C. players
Expatriate footballers in Bolivia
Argentine people of Serbian descent